Target is a 2014 Chinese action suspense crime film directed by Yang Jiang. It was released on October 24.

Cast
Song Yang
Yang Juncheng
Kara Wang
Maria Makarenko
Ma Qiang
Ran Tian

Reception
By November 3, the film had earned ¥1.57 million at the Chinese box office.

References

2014 crime action films
Chinese crime action films
2010s English-language films
2010s Mandarin-language films